Kirsi Katariina Piha (born 14 October 1967 in Helsinki, Finland) is a Finnish Communications consultant and former politician. Piha's party is National Coalition Party. She was a member of City Council of Helsinki from 1992 to 1996. Piha was a member of parliament from May 1994 to November 1996 and then March 1999 to March 2003. She has a degree of Master of Science in Economics. Piha has published several books like Äitijohtaja (2006) and Rytmihäiriö (2015).

In March 2016 she married Marco Mäkinen.

References 

Finnish politicians
1967 births
Living people
National Coalition Party politicians
20th-century Finnish politicians
Finnish women in politics